The Web Long House and Motel is a historic former motel complex on the north side of United States Route 63, just east of Springwood Road, on the outskirts of Hardy, Arkansas.  The complex includes three buildings: a single-story stone house, which also served as the office for the motel, a duplex located just to its east, also built of flagstone, and a four-unit stone motel building facing south.  The complex was built in 1943 by Web Long, president of the Hardy Development Council, as a home for his family and a business serving travelers.  It is one of the earliest known examples of motel architecture in Sharp County.

The buildings were listed on the National Register of Historic Places in 1998.

See also
National Register of Historic Places listings in Sharp County, Arkansas

References

Houses on the National Register of Historic Places in Arkansas
Houses completed in 1943
Houses in Sharp County, Arkansas
Motels in the United States
National Register of Historic Places in Sharp County, Arkansas